Sanjō Keihan Station (三条京阪駅 Sanjō Keihan Eki) is a subway station in Higashiyama ward, city of Kyoto, Kyoto Prefecture, Japan.

General information
Sanjō Keihan Station intersects with the Keihan Electric Railway's Keihan Main Line, and is connected to the adjacent Keihan Sanjō Station. The station is physically located underneath Sanjō-dori, just east of the Kamo River and Kyoto's Kawaramachi shopping district. It is also the main station in Kyoto for trains to Yodoyabashi Station in Osaka.

Connecting line
 Keihan Railway
 Keihan Main Line, Ōtō Line (Sanjo Station)

Layout
Sanjō Keihan Station has an island platform with two tracks underground.

References

External links
 Japan Visitor info

Railway stations in Japan opened in 1997
Railway stations in Kyoto Prefecture